When The World Sings is the debut studio album by the indie rock band Fine China.

Track listing
 "We Rock Harder Than You Ever Knew"   	
 "Labor Saving Device" 	
 "They Will Love Us for Our Instruments" 	
 "When the World Sings" 	
 "Give Us Treble" 	
 "The Patient" 	
 "For All Centuries" 	
 "Comforting, Gondoliering" 	
 "I Dropped a Bomb on Your Heart" 	
 "Young, and Having Fun"

References

2000 debut albums
Fine China (band) albums
Tooth & Nail Records albums